Cephalomyidae is an extinct family of caviomorph rodents from South America. The specific relationships of the family are uncertain, and affinities to both chinchilloid and cavioid rodents have been supported. Most recently, Kramarz in 2005 performed a phylogenetic analysis supporting a relationship to the Cavioidea, as represented by Eocardiidae, although more recent analyses have placed them among the chinchilloids as relatives of the giant neoepiblemid rodents. McKenna and Bell (1997) questioned the validity of the family, placing the cephalomyid genera then known in Dasyproctidae, but Kramarz (2001) subsequently reasserted the distinctiveness of cephalomyids. 

Fossils of the family have been found in Deseadan to Colhuehuapian Fray Bentos, Deseado, Cerro Bandera and Sarmiento Formations and the Colhué Huapí Member of Argentina and the Puca Group of Bolivia.

References

Further reading 
 F. Ameghino. 1897. Mammiféres crétacés de l’Argentine (Deuxième contribution à la connaissance de la fauna mammalogique de couches à Pyrotherium) [Cretaceous mammals of Argentina (second contribution to the knowledge of the mammalian fauna of the Pyrotherium Beds)]. Boletin Instituto Geografico Argentino 18(4–9):406-521
 Kramarz, A.G. 2001. Revision of the family Cephalomyidae (Rodentia, Caviomorpha) and new cephalomyids from the early Miocene of Patagonia. Palaeovertebrata 30(1-2):51-88.
 McKenna, Malcolm C., and Bell, Susan K. 1997. Classification of Mammals Above the Species Level. Columbia University Press, New York, 631 pp. 
 Vucetich, M.G., Verzi, D.H., and Hartenberger, J.-L. 2001. Review and analysis of the South American Hystricognathi (Mammalia, Rodentia). Comptes Rendus de l'Académie des Sciences, Série IIA 329(10):763-769.

Hystricognath rodents
Prehistoric rodent families
Oligocene rodents
Miocene rodents
Chattian first appearances
Miocene extinctions
Miocene mammals of South America
Oligocene mammals of South America
Taxa named by Florentino Ameghino